Modi ministry may refer to:

 Union Council of Ministers
 First Modi ministry, the 22nd government of India headed by Narendra Modi from 2014 to 2019
 Second Modi ministry, the 23rd government of India headed by Narendra Modi from 2019 onwards
 Gujarat Council of Ministers
 First Modi ministry (Gujarat), the government of Gujarat headed by Narendra Modi from 2001 to 2002
 Second Modi ministry (Gujarat), the government of Gujarat headed by Narendra Modi from 2002 to 2007
 Third Modi ministry (Gujarat), the government of Gujarat headed by Narendra Modi from 2007 to 2012
 Fourth Modi ministry (Gujarat), the government of Gujarat headed by Narendra Modi from 2012 to 2014

See also
Narendra Modi